Abdelhamid Bouchouk (1 January 1927, Azzaba, Algeria – 9 October 2004, Toulouse, France) was an Algerian footballer. He played as a winger.

Bouchouk was a member of the Algerian FLN team from 1958 to 1962.

Club career
 1948–1949: FC Sète 
 1949–1951: Olympique Marseille 
 1951–1958: Toulouse FC

Honours
 Won the Ligue 2 Championship once with Toulouse FC in 1953
 Won the Coupe de France once with Toulouse FC in 1957, scoring a goal in the final

References

External links
 

1927 births
2004 deaths
Algerian footballers
FLN football team players
FC Sète 34 players
Olympique de Marseille players
Ligue 1 players
Ligue 2 players
People from Skikda Province
Association football wingers
21st-century Algerian people